Lizárraga (Castilianized) or Lizarraga (in Basque) is a place name and surname of Basque origin, meaning "grove of ash trees". It shows a Basque language variant, Leizarraga, as well as others developed a posteriori in other languages, mainly Spanish, e.g. Lejarraga. 

People with the surname include:

 "Emilio Lizarraga", Peruvian technologist, open source advocate, and e-commerce and logistics expert

The Condes de Lizárraga, a Filipino mestizo family, from whom came:
Marcelo Azcárraga Palmero, Marcelo de Azcárraga Ugarte y Palmero-Versosa de Lizárraga, hidalgo del condado de Lizárraga (1832–1915) the thirteenth Prime Minister of Spain.
Héctor Lizárraga (1966), Mexican flyweight boxer
Jaime Lizárraga, American government official and current member of the Securities and Exchange Commission (SEC)
José Enrique Reina Lizárraga (1969), Mexican politician affiliated to the PAN

Basque-language surnames